Guayacán is the Spanish word for species in the genus Guaiacum.

Guayacán may also refer to:
Albizia pistaciifolia, Guayacán Cenega, Guayacán Chaparro or Guayacán Hobo (Colombia)
Centrolobium yavizanum (Colombia)
Minquartia guianensis (Ecuador)
Porlieria chilensis (Chile)
Tabebuia chrysantha (Ecuador, Venezuela)
Guayacán, a novel by Guatemalan writer Virgilio Rodríguez Macal